L. floribunda may refer to:

 Lagerstroemia floribunda, a plant native to tropical Southeast Asia
 Lappula floribunda, a borage native to western North America
 Lechenaultia floribunda, an Australian plant
 Ledebouria floribunda, a perennial herb
 Lindera floribunda, a dioecious plant
 Litsea floribunda, a dioecious plant
 Lockhartia floribunda, an epiphytic orchid
 Lophostachys floribunda, a plant native to Brazil